The Chesterfield Heights Historic District is a national historic district located at Norfolk, Virginia. It encompasses 402 contributing buildings, 1 contributing site, and 1 contributing structure in a cohesive residential neighborhood located just to the northeast of downtown Norfolk. It was platted in 1904, and largely developed between 1915 and 1950.  There are notable examples of Queen Anne and Italianate style residential architecture.  Notable non-residential buildings include the St. Luke's Holiness Church of Christ's Disciples (c. 1950), Monticello Baptist Church (1925), and the Garrett Community Church (1940).

It was listed on the National Register of Historic Places in 2003.

References

Houses on the National Register of Historic Places in Virginia
Historic districts on the National Register of Historic Places in Virginia
National Register of Historic Places in Norfolk, Virginia
Italianate architecture in Virginia
Queen Anne architecture in Virginia
Neighborhoods in Norfolk, Virginia
Houses in Norfolk, Virginia